The men's synchronized 10 metre platform was one of eight diving events included in the Diving at the 2004 Summer Olympics programme.

The competition was held as an outright final:

Final 14 August — Each pair of divers performed five dives freely chosen from the five diving groups, with two dives limited to a 2.0 degree of difficulty and the others without limitation. Divers could perform different dives during the same dive if both presented the same difficulty degree. The final ranking was determined by the score attained by the pair after all five dives had been performed.

Results

References

Sources

 Diving. Official Report of the XXVIII Olympiad - Results

Men
2004
Men's events at the 2004 Summer Olympics